Diego Alejandro Oyarzún Carrasco (born 19 January 1993), commonly known as Diego Oyarzún, is a Chilean professional footballer who plays for Everton de Viña del Mar as a central defender.

Career
Diego did all lower in Universidad Católica but his debut was in Deportes Valdivia.

On 1 July 2017 Oyarzún joined Lithuanian champions Žalgiris. After 2018 season he left FK Žalgiris.

Personal life
He is the son of Marcelo Oyarzún, a Fitness Coach who was a member of technical staff of Colo-Colo at the 1991 Copa Libertadores, among others football teams, and grandson of Nelson Oyarzún, commonly known as Consomé (Consomme), a historical Chilean football manager who used to serve a portion of broth to his players and whose name was given to the municipal stadium of Chillán.

References

External links
 alyga.lt official (lt)
UC profile	

1993 births
Living people
Chilean footballers
Chilean expatriate footballers
Unión La Calera footballers
San Marcos de Arica footballers
Deportes Valdivia footballers
Club Deportivo Palestino footballers
Club Deportivo Universidad Católica footballers
FK Žalgiris players
Coquimbo Unido footballers
C.D. Huachipato footballers
Everton de Viña del Mar footballers
Chilean Primera División players
A Lyga players
Expatriate footballers in Lithuania
Chilean expatriate sportspeople in Lithuania
Association football central defenders